The Zwiefalter Aach or Zwiefalter Ach is a river in Reutlingen district and Biberach district in Baden-Württemberg, Germany. It is approximately 9 kilometres long and is a tributary of the Danube near Zwiefalten.
The river is known for the Wimsener Höhle.

References

Rivers of Baden-Württemberg
Rivers of Germany